Rafael Delgado, former known as San Juan del Rio, is a municipality located in the mountainous central zone of the State of Veracruz, about 140 km from the state capital Xalapa.

In 1831, the village of San Juan del Río constituted a municipality. By decree, on November 5, 1932, the municipality became known as Rafael Delgado, in honor of the author, a native of nearby Córdoba.

Geographic Limits

The municipality is bordered to the north by Orizaba and Ixmatlahuacan, to the east by Ixtaczoquitlán, to the south by San Andrés Tenejapan, Tlilapan and Nogales, and to the west by Río Blanco. It is irrigated by the Río Blanco river.

Agriculture
The municipality produces principally maize, sugarcane and coffee.

Celebrations
Every June, a celebration is held in honor of San Juan de la Concepción, patron of the town, and in December the town holds festivities in honor of the Virgin of Guadalupe.

Weather
The weather in Rafael Delgado is cold and wet all year, with rains in summer and autumn.

References

External links 
  Municipal Official webpage
  Municipal Official Information

Municipalities of Veracruz